Clathrinidae is a family of calcareous sponges in the order Clathrinida. It contains the following genera: 

Arturia Borojevia Brattegardia Clathrina Ernstia Nicola

References